Liu Qing (born 6 August 1964) is a Chinese former basketball player who competed in the 1984 Summer Olympics, in the 1988 Summer Olympics, and in the 1992 Summer Olympics.

References

1964 births
Living people
Basketball players from Hunan
Chinese women's basketball players
Basketball players at the 1984 Summer Olympics
Basketball players at the 1988 Summer Olympics
Basketball players at the 1992 Summer Olympics
Medalists at the 1992 Summer Olympics
Medalists at the 1984 Summer Olympics
Olympic basketball players of China
Olympic silver medalists for China
Olympic bronze medalists for China
Olympic medalists in basketball
Asian Games medalists in basketball
Basketball players at the 1982 Asian Games
Basketball players at the 1986 Asian Games
Basketball players at the 1990 Asian Games
Asian Games gold medalists for China
Asian Games silver medalists for China
Medalists at the 1982 Asian Games
Medalists at the 1986 Asian Games
Medalists at the 1990 Asian Games